National freeway 8 is a freeway, which begins in Annan District of Tainan City and ends in Sinhua District, Tainan on the provincial highway 20. The first 4.2 kilometres of the freeway (from provincial highway 17A to Tainan district road 133) is expressway-standard road with partial controlled access, while the rest is controlled-access highway.

Length
The total length is 15.5 km (9.6 miles).

Major cities along the route
Tainan City

Exit List

Lanes
The lanes in each direction are listed below.
2 lanes:
Tainan Top - Xinhua End

See also
 Highway system in Taiwan

Notes
Completed in 1999.

References

http://www.freeway.gov.tw/

Freeway No. 08